The Rosemont Yard is a CTA rail yard Rosemont, Illinois which stores cars from the Blue Line of the Chicago Transit Authority. Currently, 2600-series and 3200-series railcars are stored here. It is adjacent to Rosemont station.

References 

 Chicago Transit Authority